Augustin Iyamuremye (born 15 March 1946) is a Rwandan politician and academic. He is married, and his wife is a daughter of former president Theodore Sindikubwabo. He has been serving as the President of the Senate from 17 October 2019 until his resignationon December 8 2022. Iyamuremye is a  member of the Social Democratic Party. Iyamuremye was Senior Intelligence Officer during the Habyarimana’s regime, Minister of Foreign Affairs under former President Pasteur Bizimungu from 1999 until the government's resignation in March 2000 and served as the Minister of Information under Paul Kagame. Iyamuremye is from the Southern Province. He is also a member of the Pan-African Parliament and Professor at the National University of Rwanda. He is a Veterinary doctor by profession.

He was the President of Rwandan Senate until his resignation on December 8 2022. He is a supporter of the Campaign for the Establishment of a United Nations Parliamentary Assembly.

References

1946 births
Living people
Presidents of the Senate (Rwanda)
Foreign ministers of Rwanda
Academic staff of the National University of Rwanda
Members of the Pan-African Parliament from Rwanda
Social Democratic Party (Rwanda) politicians
Information ministers of Rwanda
People from Southern Province, Rwanda
Veterinarians from Africa